Ksenia Alexandrovna Parubets (née Ilchenko; born 31 October 1994) is a Russian volleyball player, playing as an outside-spiker. She is part of the Russia women's national volleyball team.

She participated in the 2015 FIVB Volleyball World Grand Prix.
She won the gold medal at the 2015 Women's European Volleyball Championship.  On club level she plays for VC Uralochka-NTMK.

On 7 May 2016, then-Ilchenko married Ruslan Parubets.

National team 
 2015 FIVB World Grand Prix -  (with Russia)
 2015 Women's European Volleyball Championship –  (with Russia)
 2019 FIVB Volleyball Women's World Cup –  (with Russia)

References

External links
http://www.cev.lu/Competition-Area/PlayerDetails.aspx?TeamID=7865&PlayerID=32937&ID=562

1994 births
Living people
Russian women's volleyball players
Place of birth missing (living people)
20th-century Russian women
21st-century Russian women